How You Luv That is the debut album by New Orleans hip hop duo, Big Tymers, released in 1997 (re-released on March 17, 1998 in stores) on Cash Money Records. The album sold over 100,000 copies without the benefit of major radio or video airplay.

Cash Money re-released How You Luv That as How You Luv That Vol. 2 in late 1998 after signing its distribution deal with Universal Records. The re-release substitutes a remix of "Stun'n" for the original version and adds "Big Ballin'," "Money & Power," and "Drop It Like It's Hot.

Tracklist 
"Intro" (feat. Bulletproof & Lil' Wayne) - 3:08
"Playboy (Don't Hate Me)" (feat. Bun B & Lil' Wayne) - 4:40
"Stun'n" - 5:22
"Tear It Up" (feat. B.G. & Lil' Wayne) - 4:02
"Phone Call (Skit)" - 1:24     
"How You Luv That?" (feat. Juvenile & Lil' Wayne) - 4:54
"Cutlass, Monte Carlo's & Regals" (feat. Juvenile & Lil' Wayne) - 4:45
"Millionaire Dream" (feat. Cadillac & Lil' Wayne) - 5:23
"Beautiful" - 4:07
"Ballin'" (feat. Bun B) - 5:08
"Top Of Tha Line Nigga" (feat. Lil' Wayne) - 4:20
"Suga & Pac, Puff & Big" (feat. B.G. & Lil' Wayne) - 4:35
"Preppy Pimp" - 5:03
"Broads" (feat. Lil' Wayne) - 4:35
"Try'n 2 Make A Million" (feat. Juvenile) - 3:44
"Drivin' Em" (feat. Larell & Lil' Wayne) - 4:45
"Outro" (feat. Bun B) - 4:26

Personnel
Barewolf: Keyboards
Corey Funky Fingers: Guitars, Bass

Production
Produced and Mixed by Manny Fresh
Recorded by Manny Fresh, Barewolf and Corey Funky Fingers
All Songs Published by B/M7 & Money Mack Music

Chart positions

References

1998 debut albums
Big Tymers albums
Birdman (rapper) albums
Cash Money Records albums
Mannie Fresh albums
Albums produced by Mannie Fresh